Sarzal is a village in Jalalvand Rural District, Firuzabad District, Kermanshah County, Kermanshah Province, Iran. At the 2006 census, its population was 162, in 37 families.

References 

Populated places in Kermanshah County